The Ministry of the Interior is the interior ministry of the Kingdom of Cambodia. The ministry has a broad mandate and is responsible for public administration throughout Cambodia's 25 capital city-provinces and 203 district/Khan/Municipality. The Ministry governs the Cambodian National Police and the administration of the law enforcement; including the police academy, police training, judicial police, anti-drug efforts, border police and prison administration.

The Ministry liaises with ASEAN law enforcement offices and with Interpol.

The Minister of Interior since 1992 is Deputy Prime Minister Sar Kheng, assisted by 6 secretaries of state and 4 under-secretaries of state.

Organization
Head Minister: Deputy Prime Minister Sar Kheng

Office of the Minister (the Minister Cabinet)
This office is headed by a Secretary of State in charge as the Office Head:

General Department Rank
The Ministry of Interior consists of 11 general departments. These general departments are headed by General Director Rank:
Ministry of Interior, General Secretariat.
Ministry of Interior, General Commissariat of National Police.
Ministry of Interior, General Department of Administrations.
Ministry of Interior, General Departments of Inspection.
Ministry of Interior, General Department of Prison.
Ministry of Interior, General Department of Immigration.
Ministry of Interior, General Department of Identification.
Ministry of Interior, General Department of Logistics and Finance.
Ministry of Interior, General Department of Internal Audit.
Ministry of Interior, Police Academy of Cambodia.
Ministry of Interior, Legislative Council.

See also
Government of Cambodia
Law enforcement in Cambodia

References

External links
Ministry of Interior, homepage
Ministry of Interior, National Police Magazine
Ministry of Interior, General Department of Prison

Government ministries of Cambodia
Law enforcement in Cambodia
Cambodia
Phnom Penh